The northern white-fringed antwren (Formicivora intermedia) is an insectivorous bird in the antbird family Thamnophilidae. It is a resident breeder in tropical South America and occurs in northern Colombia, northern Venezuela and on the islands of Tobago and Margarita.

Taxonomy
The German ornithologist Jean Cabanis described the northern white-fringed antwren in 1847 and coined its current binomial name Formicivora intermedia. It was formerly considered conspecific with the southern white-fringed antwren (Formicivora grisea) but is now often treated as a separate species based on the difference in vocalization.

There are six subspecies:
 Formicivora intermedia alticincta Bangs, 1902 – Isla del Rey (Panama)
 Formicivora intermedia hondae (Chapman, 1914) – northwest Colombia
 Formicivora intermedia fumosa (Cory, 1913) – northeast Colombia and west Venezuela
 Formicivora intermedia intermedia Cabanis, 1847 – north Colombia and north Venezuela, Margarita Island (off Venezuela)
 Formicivora intermedia tobagensis Dalmas, 1900 – Tobago Island
 Formicivora intermedia orenocensis Hellmayr, 1904 – south central Venezuela

Description
The male of the nominate subspecies has grayish brown upperparts, a blackish tail and blackish wings with white spots on the coverts and a white bar. A white  extends as a broad stripe down the side of the breast and body. The underparts are black. The female has upperparts similar to that of the male but the underparts are buff with darker spots or streaking on the breast.

References

External links
Xeno-canto: audio recordings of the Northern White-fringed Antwren

northern white-fringed antwren
Birds of Colombia
Birds of Venezuela
Birds of Trinidad and Tobago
northern white-fringed antwren